Bartholomew the Apostle was one of the twelve Apostles of Jesus.

Bartholomew may also refer to:
 Bartholomew (name), a given name and family name
 Bartholomew I of Constantinople, Ecumenical Patriarch of Constantinople
 Bayou Bartholomew, a bayou in Arkansas and Louisiana
 Bartholomew County, Indiana
 Bartholomew River, a tributary of the Southwest Miramichi River in the province of New Brunswick, Canada
 Bartholomew School, a secondary school in Eynsham, West Oxfordshire, England
 Bartholomew Township, a township in Lincoln County, Arkansas
 Bartholomew Company, automobile manufacturer of the Glide

See also
 Barthélemy (disambiguation)
 Bartholomeus
 Bartolo (disambiguation)
 Bartolomé (disambiguation)
 Bartolomeo
 John Bartholomew and Son, a cartography publisher
 Saint Barthélemy, an island in the Caribbean
 St. Bartholomew's (disambiguation)
 St. Bartholomew's Day massacre (1572)